Captain Maurice Archibald Bourke  (22 December 1853 – 16 September 1900) was a Royal Navy officer who became Naval Secretary.

Naval career
Born the son of Richard Bourke, 6th Earl of Mayo, Bourke joined the Royal Navy in 1867 and advanced to command HMS Surprise, Prince Alfred's Royal Yacht in the late 1880s. In 1891 he was made Flag Captain of HMS Victoria. On 22 June 1893, while manoeuvring under the orders of the commander of the British Mediterranean Fleet, Vice-Admiral Sir George Tryon, Victoria collided with  near Tripoli, Lebanon and quickly sank, taking 358 crew with her, including Tryon. At the court martial Bourke was absolved of all blame. Bourke also became an extra equerry to Prince Alfred.

He was appointed Assistant Director of Torpedoes in 1895 and Senior Officer of the Newfoundland Fisheries Division in 1896. He went on to be Naval Secretary to the First Lord of the Admiralty and died in office.

Private life
In the late 1880s Bourke was romantically linked with Princess Victoria of Prussia, a grand-daughter of Queen Victoria, and some members of the royal family looked on the match as possible. It was Bourke who broke off the romance, and not the princess. The Duchess of Edinburgh wrote to Princess Charlotte of Prussia in 1890 that Victoria was still in love with Bourke and had been heart-broken by the end of the flirtation.

References

1853 births
1900 deaths
Companions of the Order of St Michael and St George
Younger sons of earls
Royal Navy officers
Royal Navy personnel who were court-martialled
Equerries